Cyclotetradecane is an organic compound with the chemical formula C14H28. It is known as having low strain energy.

Properties:

References
http://www.chemspider.com/Chemical-Structure.60847.html

Cycloalkanes